Woorinen is a town located in the Rural City of Swan Hill, Victoria, Australia. Woorinen R.S. post office opened on 1 February 1915, renamed Woorinen on 1 April 1919 and was closed on 24 September 1993.

References

Towns in Victoria (Australia)
Rural City of Swan Hill